Husbands is a populated place in Barbados.

See also
 List of cities, towns and villages in Barbados

References

Populated places in Barbados